Joshua Jacob Morrow (born February 8, 1974) is an American actor. In 1994, he began his career when he was cast in the role of Nicholas Newman on The Young and the Restless. In 1998, he joined the soul-pop group 3Deep; the group disbanded in 2001.

Career
Morrow has portrayed the character Nicholas Newman on The Young and the Restless since 1994. Early in his career, he formed the musical group 3Deep with Eddie Cibrian, his best friend and former co-star on Y&R, and CJ Huyer.

Personal life
Morrow plays on the World Poker Tour in the Hollywood Home Games for The V Foundation for Cancer Research charity. On August 4, 2001, Morrow married Tobe Keeney. Together, the pair have four children: three boys and one girl.

Filmography

Awards and nominations

References

External links
 
 Official Y&R Bio of Joshua Morrow
 
 

1974 births
Living people
20th-century American male actors
21st-century American male actors
21st-century American singers
21st-century American male singers
American male soap opera actors
American people of Irish descent
American poker players
American male pop singers
Moorpark College alumni
People from Juneau, Alaska
3Deep members